The Namibian Army is the ground warfare branch of the Namibian Defence Force.

History
Development of Namibia's army was fastest of the three arms of Service. The first units of the Army were deployed as early as 1990. The Army was formed when two enemies South West African Territorial Force and the People's Liberation Army of Namibia where inducted after Namibia's independence into the newly created Namibian Defence Force.

Role

The Ministry of Defence has outlined the Army policy as follows:
"The Army's principal roles will continue to be as already outlined in the defence policy. The Army will strive to maximise its operational effectiveness through the recruitment of the best young men and women who wish to pursue a military career, their effective training and employment. The Army's equipment priorities are improved troop-lift capacity (road and air); engineer, artillery, anti-tank and air defence and communication systems: the aim being to create a secure, integrated, efficient and cost-effective systems."

"The Army will remain a well-disciplined and accountable, professional (all volunteer) force; it will include development of a Reserve; it will continue to train along the lines of other Commonwealth armies; it will train with other Namibian forces (such as the police) to rehearse plans for aid to the civil authorities, civil ministries and civil community; and it will promote a good public image and contribute to the communities in which it is based."

Organisation
The Army is a hierarchical organisation with the Army commander exercising overall command. The Army headquarters are located at Grootfontein military base,a former SADF logistics base. The Army has several thousand members. Senior Army officers also dominate staff positions at Defence Headquarters

Deployments

Local deployments
See also: Caprivi Conflict

The Namibian Army had a convoy service on Namibia's Trans Caprivi Highway which runs from Otavi, Grootfontein, Rundu, Katima Mulilo until Ngoma border post on the Namibia and Botswana border. The convoy system ran twice daily between Bagani and Kongola in the then Caprivi region. The convoy system was run from the year 2000 till 2002.

SADC deployments
Angola (Operation Mandume ya Ndemufayo)The Namibian Army also deployed troops to help fight UNITA insurgents active in and around the Kavango region. The operation codenamed Mandume ya Ndemufayo was a response to UNITA attacks on Namibian citizens. The Namibian cross border pursuit operations were carried out with consent of the Angolan government. At least two soldiers were killed in operation Mandume ya Ndemufayo. In an operation between 30 January 2001 to 14 February 2001 an estimated 19 UNITA rebels were killed while various weaponry such as Anti Tank and Anti personnel landmines assault rifle ranging from AK-47 and R-1 rifles were recovered. In a joint operation with the Angolan Armed Forces, the Namibian Defence Force in May 2001 helped dislodge UNITA from Mavinga in May 2001.

Democratic Republic of the Congo (Operation Atlantic)The Namibian Army deployed a Battle group during the Second Congo War that numbered about 2000 troops and consisted of Infantry, Artillery Signals, Air Force Detachments.The first commander of the battle group was Brigadier James Auala. About 30 Namibian Serviceman died in the DRC operations.  The Operation was Code named Atlantic . The SADC coalition force commander was always a Zimbabwean and deputy force commander a Namibian while the Chief of Staff was an Angolan.  11 Namibian soldiers were held as prisoners of war in Rwanda, they were released in June 2000. The soldiers were captured in April 1999 in the Lusambo area which is about 120 kilometers east of Mbuji-Mayi.  In January 2001 after Laurent-Désiré Kabila's death the Namibian army contingent was reinforced to not only provide security to Heads of States at the funeral but also to reinforce the SADC contingents in Kinshasa and Lubumbashi. Namibia was also the first foreign country to withdraw its troops and by September 2001 all Namibian soldiers had been withdrawn. Seven soldiers who have been missing in action have since been declared dead. The seven had gone missing around the Deya River close to Kabalo, Deya-Katutu and Lusambo areas. 137 soldiers that had survived the  encirclement during the siege of Ikela were presented with commendation medals

UN deployments

 UNAMIC - The army deployed a Company sized unit to UNAMIC.
  United Nations Angola Verification Mission III (UNAVEM III)
 MONUA
 United Nations Mission in Liberia (UNMIL)

For the peacekeeping operation in Liberia the Namibian Army contribution was known as Namibian Battalion (NAMBATT) and about 800 infantry troops per NAMBATT contingent were mustered to form a battalion for this operation. Troops were rotated and rotations numbered up to NAMBATT V. A NAMBATT contingent commanding officer stated his unit was to comprise "two Mot Inf Coys, two rifle companies, headquarters company and fire support company while the battalion is equipped with 10 Wolf APC's, 12 Casspir APC's and 11 WER Wolf APC's".

Unit structure
The standard operational units are structured according to the British commonwealth system:

Units

Air Defence Corps

Air Defence Brigade

Artillery Corps

4 Artillery Brigade
12 Artillery Regiment
44 Artillery Regiment
46 Artillery Regiment
21 Artillery Regiment
26 Artillery Regiment

Infantry Corps

21 Motorised Infantry Brigade
21 Guard Battalion
211 Battalion
212 Battalion
213 Mechanized Infantry Battalion
Based in Windhoek

12 Motorised Infantry Brigade
124 Battalion
125 Battalion
Based at Walvis Bay
126 Battalion
Based in Gobabis.

26 Motorised Infantry Brigade.
261 Motorized Infantry Battalion
Based in Rundu.The Commanding Officer is Lt Col Liyali Given Numwa who succeeded Lt Col David Diyeve.
262 Motorized Infantry Battalion
Based in Katima Mulilo. Presivous Commanding officers includes Erastus Kashopola
263 Motorized Infantry Battalion
Based at Oshakati The current Commanding Officer is Lt Col Wesley Muruko. Previous Commanding Officers included Erastus Kashopola and Colonel Abed Mukumangeni.

Engineer Corps

Engineer Regiment
Based in Otavi

Logistics Formation
 Logistic Support Battalion (Namibia)

Provost Corps

Military Police Battalion

Recce Formation
 Recce Regiment

Signals Corps

Signal Regiment

Training Corps

Army Battle School (Namibia) Oshivelo
Based at the former Oshivelo SADF training base has been transformed into an army battle school. The commandant of the battle school is Colonel H. Mvula who succeeded Colonel Joel Kapala  as-off 6 January 2015,Colonel Kapala succeed Colonel Kashindi Eusebi Kashindi.
Technical Training Centre (TTC)
The Army TTC offers training to army soldiers covering mechanics and electrical configurations of armaments,military weapons and equipment

School of Artillery
Based at the Oluno Military Base, the school is responsible for the training requirement of all soldiers specializing to become artillery gunners. Lt Col Ambrosius Kwedhi is the Commandant of the School.

Command Structure

Army commander
The position of Army commander is held by a commissioned officer with the rank of major general. The Army Commander exercises the overall command of the Army. The current Army commander is Major General Matheus Alueendo.
1990-2000 Maj-Gen Solomon Huwala
2000-2005 Maj-Gen Martin Shalli
2005-2011 Maj-Gen Peter Nambundunga
2011-2013 Maj-Gen John Mutwa
2013-2017 Maj-Gen Tomas Hamunyela
2017-2019  Maj-Gen Nestor Shali Shalauda
2019–2022 Maj-Gen Matheus Alueendo
2022–present Maj-Gen Aktofel Nambahu

Senior Appointments

Army equipment

Individual weapons

Vehicles
Vehicles of the Namibian Army are made up of a variety of suppliers including those from the former Soviet Union, Russia, Brazil, & South Africa. Some vehicles were donated by SWAPO, formerly a liberation movement which later became the ruling party of the country at independence, and SWATF, the security force of the then South West Africa administration. The army has received WZ523 Infantry Fighting Vehicles from China which serve with mechanized infantry units. These vehicles are supplemented by the Namibian made Wolf series of MRAPs. South African made Casspirs are also in service which were inherited from the South-West Africa Territorial Force. To enhance mobility it was announced that the Army will receive the Agrale Marruá which appeared at the 25th Independence celebration parade in 2015 and are primarily used by the Namibian Special Forces.

Artillery
Artillery is also dominated by Soviet-era weapons, also donated by SWAPO. They have been supplemented by 24 G2 artillery donated by South Africa.

Anti aircraft weapons
Air defence equipment of the Army is also made up of Soviet-era weaponry.

Special Forces
The Army commandos and airborne paratroopers are part of the Namibian Special Forces.

Ranks and insignia
Army ranks are based on Commonwealth ranks.
The highest rank in peace time a commissioned officer can attain in the army is major general. There may, however, be an exception when an army officer is appointed as Chief of the Defence Force, for which the individual will ascend to the lieutenant general. The highest rank an enlisted member can attain is warrant officer class 1.

Commissioned officer ranks
The rank insignia of commissioned officers.

Other ranks
The rank insignia of non-commissioned officers and enlisted personnel.

Citations

Further reading
People's Liberation Army of Namibia
South West African Territorial Force

Military of Namibia
Namibia